Graham Arthur Barden (September 25, 1896 – January 29, 1967) was a US Representative from North Carolina between 1935 and 1961 for the Democratic Party.

Born in Sampson County, North Carolina in 1896, he moved to Burgaw, North Carolina at the age of 12, where he attended public schools. During World War I, Barden was a seaman in the United States Navy.

After leaving the Navy in 1919, Barden attended the University of North Carolina at Chapel Hill, where he studied law and was admitted to the bar in 1920. After briefly practicing law and teaching high school that same year, he became a judge in the Craven County courts, a post he held until 1924.

In 1932, Barden was elected to the North Carolina House of Representatives; two years later, he won the first of thirteen consecutive terms in the United States House. During the 78th and 79th Congresses, he chaired the House Education Committee; after that committee merged to become the Education and Labor Committee, he again became chairman in the 81st, 82nd, 84th, 85th, and 86th sessions.

He was a signatory to the 1956 Southern Manifesto that opposed the desegregation of public schools ordered by the Supreme Court in Brown v. Board of Education.

He chose not to stand for re-election in 1960 and died in New Bern, North Carolina in 1967. He is buried in Cedar Grove Cemetery.

In 1979, Campbell University Press published a biography by Elmer L. Puryear.

Graham A. Barden Elementary School, in Havelock, North Carolina is named after him.

Notes

References

 Puryear, Elmer L. Graham A. Barden: Conservative Carolina Congressman. (Buies Creek, NC: Campbell University Press, 1979)
 Reeves, A.E. Congressional Committee Chairmen: Three Who Made an Evolution. (The University Press of Kentucky, 1993)

1896 births
1967 deaths
North Carolina state court judges
Democratic Party members of the North Carolina House of Representatives
Politicians from New Bern, North Carolina
Democratic Party members of the United States House of Representatives from North Carolina
United States Navy sailors
20th-century American politicians
People from Sampson County, North Carolina
People from Burgaw, North Carolina
20th-century American judges
American segregationists